Buenos Aires Airport  is an airport serving Buenos Aires, a city in the Puntarenas Province of Costa Rica.

There is mountainous terrain northwest through east of the airport.

See also

Transport in Costa Rica
List of airports in Costa Rica

References

External links
OpenStreetMap - Buenos Aires Airport
FallingRain - Buenos Aires Airport
OurAirports - Buenos Aires Airport

Airports in Costa Rica
Buildings and structures in Puntarenas Province